The 1981 Canadian Grand Prix was a Formula One motor race held at Circuit Île Notre-Dame, Montreal on 27 September 1981. It was the fourteenth race of the 1981 Formula One World Championship.

The race was run in wet conditions, and ended after 63 of the scheduled 70 laps due to the two-hour time limit. Frenchman Jacques Laffite won in a Talbot Ligier-Matra, with Northern Ireland's John Watson second in a McLaren-Ford and local hero Gilles Villeneuve third in a Ferrari. Brazilian Nelson Piquet finished fifth in his Brabham-Ford, having started from pole position, while Drivers' Championship rival, Argentine Carlos Reutemann, could only manage tenth in his Williams-Ford. Piquet thus moved within one point of Reutemann with one race to go, while the win gave Laffite an outside chance of the title. Despite both Reutemann and Australian teammate Alan Jones failing to score, Williams clinched the Constructors' Championship.

This would turn out to be Laffite's final F1 victory, as well as the last for the Ligier team for fifteen years, until the 1996 Monaco Grand Prix. It was also the last time the Canadian Grand Prix was held in the fall, as the race would move to June the following year.

Pre-race 
Prior to the race, Alan Jones announced that he was retiring from the sport after clinching the title the previous year. Rumors were also spreading around in paddock that Niki Lauda had tested for McLaren at Donington Park and that he was planning a comeback.

Qualifying 
Nelson Piquet clinched pole with a time of 1:29.221, with rival Carlos Reutemann alongside him on the front row. The top ten were completed by: Jones, Prost, Mansell, Rebaque, de Angelis, Arnoux, Watson and Laffite respectively.

Race
The race start was marred with bad weather. Immediately after the start, Jones took the lead after a minor collision with Reutemann which left Reutemann behind. Toward the middle of the pack, Arnoux and Pironi had a collision which resulted in Arnoux spinning out of the race. On lap 7, Jones spun and Piquet had to take evasive action, resulting in both drivers dropping down the pecking order. Prost took the lead with Laffite, who had climbed from tenth, second. Prost's lead did not last long, as Laffite overtook him on lap 13, and kept the lead to the end of the race.

Villeneuve had a minor accident that damaged his front wing. The wing flew up only to be stuck up in the air, blocking Villeneuve's race-line vision. With his forward vision impaired, he used his peripheral vision to navigate using the yellow track markers as reference. After racing this way for minutes he used vibration on the ribbed curbing,  to the point it flew off the car.  This way he managed to keep control until the end of the race, without a front wing and under the rain.

Mansell pitted for slicks, convinced the weather would turn. It did not. Within minutes he spun, heavily damaging his rear wing, and was pushed by marshals back onto the circuit. Driving slowly toward the L'Epingle at the northern end, he placed his JPS Lotus in the middle of the track but slowly edging to his left onto the racing line, at the braking area. Prost, on the racing line and much faster, tried unsuccessfully to avoid colliding but could not, resulting in both drivers retiring from the race.

Watson was able to catch and pass Villeneuve a few laps later and the two finished second and third respectively, with Villeneuve clinching his third and last podium of the year on home soil. Bruno Giacomelli of Alfa Romeo, who had started fifteenth, came home fourth, with pole-man Piquet coming in behind him.

Classification

Qualifying

Race

Championship standings after the race

Drivers' Championship standings

Constructors' Championship standings

References

Canadian Grand Prix
Canadian Grand Prix
Grand Prix
Grand Prix